Federico Coria (born 9 March 1992) is an Argentine tennis player. He has a career-high ATP singles ranking of No. 49 achieved on 13 February 2023. He also has a career-high doubles ranking of No. 238, achieved on 22 November 2021. Coria has won one ATP Challenger doubles title at the 2016 Campeonato Internacional de Tênis de Campinas and two ATP Challenger singles titles at the 2019 Savannah Challenger and the 2021 Czech Open.

Professional career

2019–2020: Maiden Challenger title, Major & top 100 debuts
In 2019, he won his maiden title in Savannah at the Challenger tour level. 

In 2020, on his Grand Slam debut at the US Open, Coria reached the second round, where he won his first match at a Major after the retirement of Jason Jung in the fifth set. He made his top 100 debut at a career-high of World No. 98 on 21 September 2020.  

He also reached the third round of a Grand Slam at the 2020 French Open on his debut at this Major, where he defeated Benoît Paire in the second round before losing to Jannik Sinner in straight sets.

2021: Olympics, Challenger tour success, First ATP final
In June 2021, he won his second challenger title at the 2021 Czech Open in Prostějov, defeating Alex Molcan. He reached two more Challengers finals in Milan and Salzburg. As a result, he reached a career-high of World No. 77 in singles on 12 July 2021.

He reached his first ATP tour final at the 2021 Swedish Open, where he lost to Casper Ruud. He raised to a new career-high of No. 61 on 23 August 2021. 

He also participated in the Olympics, where he lost in the opening round to Mikhail Kukushkin.

2023: Second ATP final, top 50 debut
He reached his second ATP final at the 2023 Córdoba Open defeating second seed Francisco Cerundolo by retirement and defending champion, third seed Spaniard Albert Ramos Vinolas en route. As a result he moved into the top 50 at world No. 49 on 13 February 2023.

Personal life
Federico is the younger brother of Guillermo Coria. 

In June 2018, Coria was fined $10,000 and banned for eight months on anti-corruption charges for failing to report a match-fixing attempt in 2015 and for not cooperating with the subsequent investigation.

Singles performance timeline

Current through the 2022 Miami Open.

ATP career finals

Singles: 2 (2 runner-ups)

Challenger and Futures finals

Singles: 31 (14–17)

Doubles: 22 (7–15)

References

External links

 
 

1992 births
Living people
Argentine male tennis players
Tennis controversies
Match fixing in tennis
Olympic tennis players of Argentina
Tennis players at the 2020 Summer Olympics
Sportspeople from Rosario, Santa Fe